A rhinestone is a diamond simulant made from rock crystal, glass or acrylic.

Rhinestone may also refer to:

 Rhinestone (film), a 1984 comedy starring Sylvester Stallone and Dolly Parton
 Rhinestone (film soundtrack), a soundtrack album from the film
 Rhinestone Doozer, a fictional  character in the TV series Fraggle Rock
 "Rhinestone", a song by Sort Sol from Snakecharmer
 "Rhinestone", a song by Linkin Park (when they were known as Xero), which would be altered to become the song "Forgotten".

See also 
 RhineStoned, a 2007 album by Pam Tillis
 Rhinestone Cowboy